The 1955 Pittsburgh Panthers football team represented the University of Pittsburgh in the 1955 college football season.  The Panthers were led by first-year head coach John Michelosen and played their home games at Pitt Stadium in Pittsburgh, Pennsylvania.

In a season that included upsets over top-ten teams Duke and rival West Virginia, Pitt had their most successful season in years. The Panthers finished ranked in the polls for the first time since 1938 and were invited to their first bowl game since the 1937 Rose Bowl.

Pittsburgh was invited to the 1956 Sugar Bowl, played against Georgia Tech. Intense controversy surrounded the bowl game, as Pittsburgh had a black player, Bobby Grier, at a time when the sport was not fully integrated. Many people opposed Pittsburgh playing in the bowl, and having desegregated seating sections in the stands, including Georgia governor Marvin Griffin. Georgia's Governor publicly threatened Georgia Tech's president Blake R. Van Leer in an attempt to bar Grier or stop the game.  The game ultimately was played without incident, and marked the first integrated Sugar Bowl.

Schedule

Coaching staff

Team players drafted into the NFL

References

Pittsburgh
Pittsburgh Panthers football seasons
Lambert-Meadowlands Trophy seasons
Pittsburgh Panthers football